Lemuel Ricketts Boulware (1895 in Springfield, Kentucky – November 7, 1990 in Delray Beach, Florida) was General Electric's vice president of labor and community relations from 1956 until 1961. Boulware's business tutelage and political cultivation of Ronald Reagan from 1954 to 1962 while Reagan was a spokesman for the company is argued to have led to Reagan's conversion from New Deal-style liberalism to Barry Goldwater-style conservatism.

Boulware's aggressive 20-year-long policy of "take-it-or-leave-it" bargaining by GE became known as "Boulwarism". He devised the strategy in reaction to success in the 1946 general strikes by the United Electrical, Radio and Machine Workers of America (UE) and the other two largest unions of the Congress of Industrial Organizations (CIO).

Published works

References

Further reading

External links
 Lemuel R. Boulware papers, Kislak Center for Special Collections, Rare Books and Manuscripts, University of Pennsylvania

1895 births
1990 deaths
General Electric people
20th-century American businesspeople